Rattle the Cage (also known as Zinzana, meaning "cell" in Arabic) is a 2015 crime thriller film directed and co-written by Majid Al Ansari. It is reportedly the first film of its genre to be produced in the United Arab Emirates.

Plot 
The film is about a man, held in a cell in a remote police station for a minor disturbance, who becomes involuntarily involved in a plan by a corrupt and violent police officer.

Cast
 Saleh Bakri as Talal
 Ali Suliman as Dabaan
 Yasa as Aida
 Ahd Kamel as Wafa (credited as Ahd)
 Abdall Bu Abed as Sherif Usman

Reception

The film was called a "world-class neo-noir thriller" by Joe Leydon writing for Variety (magazine). It was also praised by the reviewers for Huffington Post and The Austin Chronicle.

References

External links
 
 

2015 films
2015 crime thriller films
2010s Arabic-language films
Emirati crime thriller films